Odostomia resina is a species of sea snail, a marine gastropod mollusc in the family Pyramidellidae, the pyrams and their allies.

Description
The very small shell is vitreous, transparent. Its length measures 2.2 mm. The whorls of the protoconch are deeply obliquely immersed in the first of the succeeding turns, above which only the tilted edge of the last volution projects. The five whorls of the teleoconch are inflated, strongly rounded, decidedly contracted at the suture, and appressed at the summit, where the preceding whorl is reflected
through it, and gives the summit the false appearance of having a spiral cord. The sutures are strongly constricted. The periphery and the base of the body whorl are well rounded. The entire surface of the shell is marked by lines of growth which are of varying strength, and numerous closely spaced, exceedingly fine, spiral striations. The aperture is ovate. The posterior angle is acute. The outer lip is thin, showing the external sculpture within. The columella is slender, strongly curved, slightly revolute, reinforced by the base, and provided with a fold at its insertion.

Distribution
This species occurs in the Pacific Ocean off California.

References

External links
 To World Register of Marine Species
 To ITIS

resina
Gastropods described in 1909